Egletes humifusa is a species of flowering plant in the family Asteraceae. It is found only in Ecuador, where its natural habitat is subtropical or tropical dry forests. It is threatened by habitat loss.

References

Astereae
Flora of Ecuador
Critically endangered plants
Plants described in 1832
Taxonomy articles created by Polbot